Musterknaben (Role Models; English-language title: The Goodies; also known as Das Beschwerdebuch or Alles aus Liebe) is an East German romantic comedy film, directed by Johannes Knittel. It was originally released in the DDR in 1959 and again in Hungary in 1960.

Plot
Bassi and Edwin are the two laziest, most irresponsible construction workers in their workers' brigade. When they fall in love with their neighbors Thea and Susi, they pretend to be reliable young men and accompany their friends to a meeting of the local chapter house. To keep up appearances, the two are forced to undertake several duties which they would not have dreamed of doing otherwise. The plot turns into a chain of comical mistakes, but eventually the two new couples reunite and all ends well.

Cast

Reception
The West German Catholic Film Service regarded the film as one "with a weak plot line, the same old gags used over and over again." The film critic of the journal Cinema wrote that "even in the 1950s, it was not witty."

References

External links
 
Musterknaben on DEFA Sternstunden.

1959 films
1959 romantic comedy films
German romantic comedy films
East German films
1950s German-language films
1950s German films